Taeniarchis is a genus of moths belonging to the subfamily Tortricinae of the family Tortricidae.

Species
Taeniarchis acrotoma Diakonoff, 1953
Taeniarchis catenata (Meyrick, 1910)
Taeniarchis hestica Common, 1963
Taeniarchis hexopa Diakonoff, 1966
Taeniarchis periorma (Meyrick, 1910)
Taeniarchis poliostoma Diakonoff, 1953
Taeniarchis prodotis Diakonoff, 1966
Taeniarchis spilozeucta Meyrick, 1931

See also
List of Tortricidae genera

References

External links
tortricidae.com

Cnephasiini
Tortricidae genera